Elachyptera is a genus of flowering plants belonging to the family Celastraceae.

Its native range is Tropical and Southern Africa, Madagascar, Central and Southern Tropical America.

Species:

Elachyptera bipindensis 
Elachyptera coriacea 
Elachyptera festiva 
Elachyptera floribunda 
Elachyptera holtzii 
Elachyptera micrantha 
Elachyptera minimiflora 
Elachyptera parvifolia

References

Celastraceae
Celastrales genera
Taxa named by Albert Charles Smith